75th Avenue–61st Street Historic District is a national historic district in Glendale, Queens, New York.  It includes 183 contributing buildings built between 1910 and 1925.  They consist mainly of two story brick row houses with one apartment per floor.  Building features include round and box front dwellings, cast stone detailing, brownstone stoops, pressed metal cornices, and covered porches.

It includes the following addresses:
 60th Lane
75-02 to 75-50
75-01 to 75-49
61st St
72-28 to 72-72
72-31 to 72-69
75-02 to 75-50
75-01 to 75-49
62nd St
75-02 to 75-34
75-15 to 75-29
74-18 to 74-46

The district was listed on the National Register of Historic Places in 1983.

References

Glendale, Queens
Historic districts on the National Register of Historic Places in Queens, New York